Michal Baldrián (born 16 February 1970) is a Czech former cyclist. He competed in the individual pursuit at the 1992 Summer Olympics.

References

External links
 

1970 births
Living people
Czech male cyclists
Olympic cyclists of Czechoslovakia
Cyclists at the 1992 Summer Olympics
Place of birth missing (living people)